Peaceful World may refer to:

World peace, an ideal of freedom, peace, and happiness among and within all nations and/or peoples

Music 

Peaceful World (album), a 1971 album by The Rascals
"Peaceful World" (John Mellencamp song), a song on Mellencamp's album 2001 Cuttin' Heads
"Love in a Peaceful World", a 1994 song by British musical group Level 42